Renpet Mons is a large shield volcano, located on the eastern portion of a ridge-belt province on Venus.

References

Shield volcanoes
Volcanoes of Venus
Mountains on Venus